The world records in disability swimming are ratified by the International Paralympic Committee (IPC). These are the fastest performances in swimming events at meets sanctioned by the IPC.

This article lists the men's world records in long course competition. The International Paralympic Committee provides information on the current world records at their official site, though the times present sometimes differ from those provided elsewhere.

50m freestyle

100m freestyle

200m freestyle

400m freestyle

800m freestyle

1500 m freestyle

50m backstroke

100m backstroke

200 m backstroke

50m breastroke

100m breaststroke

200m breaststroke

50m butterfly

100m butterfly

200 m butterfly

150m individual medley

200m individual medley

400 m individual medley

Freestyle relays

Medley relays

Mixed relays

See also
Women's long course
Mixed relay long course
Men's short course
Women's short course

References
General
IPC world records – Men long course 13 July 2022 updated
Specific

External links

International Paralympic Committee
IPC Swimming

World IPC